Roosevelt is an unincorporated community in Lubbock County, Texas, United States. It sits at an elevation of 3136 feet (956 m). The community is part of the Lubbock Metropolitan Statistical Area. It mainly consists of Roosevelt High school. There is also a Baptist church here.

References

Unincorporated communities in Lubbock County, Texas
Lubbock metropolitan area
Unincorporated communities in Texas